Luis Díaz may refer to:

Academics
 Luis Díaz Viana (born 1951), Spanish anthropologist
 Luis A. Diaz, American oncologist

Arts and Entertainment
 Luis Días (composer) (born 1952), Dominican composer and musician also known as "El Terror"
 Cipha Sounds (born 1976), stage name of American radio and television personality Luis Diaz

Politicians
 Luis Diaz (politician), New York politician
 Luis Diaz Colon, Puerto Rican politician, mayor of Yabucoa

Sportspeople

Association football
 Luis Díaz (Spanish footballer) (born 1995), Spanish football midfielder
 Luis Díaz (Colombian footballer) (born 1997), Colombian football winger
 Luis Díaz (Costa Rican footballer) (born 1998), Costa Rican football midfielder

Other sports
Luis Díaz (cyclist) (1945–2021), Colombian Olympic cyclist
Luis Díaz (baseball) (1971–2014), Cuban pitcher in Cuban National Series
Luis Díaz (racing driver) (born 1977), Mexican auto racing driver
Luis Díaz (volleyball) (born 1983), volleyball player from Venezuela
Luis Díaz Alperi (born 1986), Mexican professional tennis player